Raúl García Velázquez (22 August 1946 - 4 December 2009) was a Mexican politician from the National Action Party. In 1995 he joined  the ranks of the National Action Party as an active member. On July 2, 2000, he won the elections for Relative Majority, of the Federal Electoral District 18 (Iztapalapa). From 2000 to 2003 he served as Deputy of the LVIII Legislature of the Mexican Congress representing the 18th Federal District. He was a member of the Federal District Commissions and also of Radio, Television and Cinematography.

References

1946 births
2009 deaths
Politicians from Mexico City
Members of the Chamber of Deputies (Mexico)
National Action Party (Mexico) politicians
21st-century Mexican politicians
Deputies of the LVIII Legislature of Mexico